Valeria Spälty (born 24 June 1983 in Glarus) is a Swiss curler.

Spälty started curling in 1992. She plays second for Mirjam Ott and is right-handed.
She won the silver medal at the Winter Olympic Games 2006 in Turin with Mirjam Ott, Binia Beeli, Manuela Kormann, and Michele Moser. She is the youngest Curling Olympic medal winner in the world.

Since 2007 Spälty and Mirjam Ott have been playing for the Curling Club Davos with two other players. With this team Spälty won the bronze medal in 2006 at the Europeans in Basel, SUI and finished in fourth place at the 2007 European Curling Championships. In March 2008 they won the bronze medal at the 2008 Vernon World Championships.

Spälty has played in 86 Games at Junior Worlds, Worlds, Europeans and Olympic Games.

She is studying Sport science, Psychology and Education at the University of Berne.

Teams

References

External links
 

1983 births
Living people
Swiss female curlers
Curlers at the 2006 Winter Olympics
Olympic curlers of Switzerland
Olympic silver medalists for Switzerland
Olympic medalists in curling
Medalists at the 2006 Winter Olympics
Continental Cup of Curling participants
European curling champions
Swiss curling champions
University of Bern alumni
People from Glarus